The Calestienne (Walloon: Calistinne) is a 130 km long narrow strip in the Belgian region of Wallonia and also in a small part of France, which is mainly formed of limestone rocks and reaches nearly 300 meters in maximum height. Because of erosion it is rich of relief.

The Calestienne is a transitional region between the lower Fagne-Famenne and the higher Ardennes. It stretches from the communes of Fourmies and Wallers-en-Fagne just across the French border till Louveigné in the Belgian province of Liège.

External links 
  www.fossiliraptor.be

Natural regions of Belgium
Areas of Belgium
Forestry in Belgium
Natural regions of France
Forestry in France
Regions of Wallonia
Landforms of Wallonia
Landforms of Liège Province
Landforms of Luxembourg (Belgium)
Landforms of Namur (province)
Landforms of Ardennes (department)
Landforms of Nord (French department)
Sprimont